The Dennis Dagger is a compact fire engine manufactured by Dennis Specialist Vehicles from 1998 to 2007. It was built for fire brigades operating in narrow rural areas unsuitable for full-size fire engines, a market previously explored by the Dennis DS series. 

First designed in 1997 with the internal codename of F98 (short for Fire 1998), production would begin by 2002. Visually and mechanically similar to the full-size Dennis Sabre, the Dennis Dagger could be bodied with a John Dennis Coachbuilders body.  Sales were originally aimed at the Kent and Devon and Somerset fire services, but in competition with other narrow truck conversions such as the MAN truck range, the Dagger sold poorly, going on to be the final new fire engine produced by Dennis Specialist Vehicles before the company's closure in 2007. 

Operators of the Dennis Dagger included the Hertfordshire and West Sussex fire brigades, with the Merseyside Fire and Rescue Service and the Dublin Fire Brigade respectively operating two former demonstrators. A development chassis was registered as late as 2011.

See also
Dennis Sabre - the Dagger's full-size equivalent.

References

Firefighting equipment
Dagger
Dagger